Stanley Eric Engelhart (3 February 1910 – 10 September 1979) was an English athlete who competed for Great Britain in the 1932 Summer Olympics. He was born and died in Selby. In 1932 he was eliminated in the quarter-finals of the 200 metres event. He was also a member of the British relay team which finished sixth in the 4×100 metres competition. At the 1930 Empire Games he won the gold medal in the 220 yards contest. He won the silver medal with the English relay team in the 4×110 yards event.

Competition record

References
Stanley Engelhart's profile at Sports Reference.com

1910 births
1979 deaths
People from Selby
English male sprinters
Olympic athletes of Great Britain
Athletes (track and field) at the 1932 Summer Olympics
Athletes (track and field) at the 1930 British Empire Games
Commonwealth Games gold medallists for England
Commonwealth Games silver medallists for England
Commonwealth Games medallists in athletics
Medallists at the 1930 British Empire Games